Stanley Rupert Rowley (11 September 1876 – 1 April 1924) was an Australian sprinter who won four medals at the 1900 Summer Olympics. He was born in Young, New South Wales and died in Manly, New South Wales.

Biography
In 1900 he won three of his four medals for Australia and one for a mixed team, when he competed as fifth member with four runners from Great Britain and Ireland.

Starting for Australia in the short sprint events at the 1900 Olympics, he won bronze medals over 60 metres, 100 metres and 200 metres. His first event was the 100 metres on 14 July, and after finishing second in the semi-final behind Arthur Duffey, he had to go through a repechage, which he won with 11.0 seconds, a few inches ahead of Norman Pritchard of India who was consequently eliminated. In the final race Rowley was unable to match this time and finished in 11.2 seconds to win a bronze medal behind silver medalist Walter Tewksbury, who ran in 11.1s. The 60 metres race on 15 July saw him finish in 7.2 seconds, less than half a metre behind gold medal winner Alvin Kraenzlein and Tewksbury, who won another silver medal. Rowley and Tewksbury would meet one final time, in the 200 metres race held on 22 July. Rowley managed to beat his rival in the heats, but Tewksbury won the final race by a clear margin. Rowley, who finished in 22.9 seconds, also lost to Norman Pritchard and received his third bronze medal.

Subsequently, Rowley was persuaded by his English athlete friends to participate on the British team which faced the French team in the 5000 metre team race. The participation was in order, as Australia was still a part of the British Empire and as well as mixed teams were allowed in 1896, 1900 and 1904. The British team needed a fifth runner, and were confident that they could win regardless of how well the fifth runner performed. Thus, the sprinter Rowley, without any experience in longer races, was drafted to fill the quota. Following the first lap Rowley began walking and trailed behind everyone. After the ninth runner crossed the finishing line, Rowley was the only athlete still going and therefore would receive tenth place were he to finish. The race officials decided that it would be pointless for him to walk the final 1,500 metres and awarded him tenth place at the end of his seventh lap. Nonetheless, the British team, including Rowley, beat the French team by three points and won the gold medal.

Rowley also won the national championships over 100 and 220 yards in 1898 and 1900. Also he won both these events at the Australasian Championships in 1897 and 1899.

He attended Sydney Boys High School from 1890.

References

External links

 (excerpt available at )

1876 births
1924 deaths
Australian male sprinters
Athletes (track and field) at the 1900 Summer Olympics
Olympic athletes of Australia
Olympic gold medalists for Australia
Olympic bronze medalists for Australia
People from Young, New South Wales
Medalists at the 1900 Summer Olympics
Olympic gold medalists in athletics (track and field)
Olympic bronze medalists in athletics (track and field)
Sport Australia Hall of Fame inductees
Sportsmen from New South Wales